This is a list of members of the European Parliament for Spain elected at the 2019 European Parliament election in Spain, and who served in the Ninth European Parliament.

Elected members 
On the Spanish Socialist Workers' Party list: (S&D)

 Iratxe García
 Lina Gálvez
 Javi López Fernández
 Inmaculada Rodríguez-Piñero
 Iban García del Blanco
 Eider Gardiazabal
 Nicolás González Casares
 Cristina Maestre
 César Luena
 Clara Aguilera García
 Ignacio Sánchez Amor
 Mónica Silvana González
 Juan Fernando López Aguilar
 Adriana Maldonado López
 Jonás Fernández
 Alicia Homs Ginel
 Javier Moreno Sánchez
 Isabel García Muñoz
 Domènec Ruiz Devesa
 Estrella Durá Ferrandis

On the People's Party list: (EPP Group)

 Dolors Montserrat
 Esteban González Pons
 Antonio López-Istúriz White
 Juan Ignacio Zoido
 Pilar del Castillo
 Javier Zarzalejos
 José Manuel García-Margallo
 Francisco José Millán Mon
 Rosa Estaràs
 Isabel Benjumea
 Pablo Arias Echeverría
 Leopoldo López Gil

On the Citizens – Party of the Citizenry list: (Renew)

 Luis Garicano (resigned on 1 September 2022)
 Eva-Maria Poptcheva (joined on 15 September 2022)
 Maite Pagazaurtundúa (UPyD)
 Soraya Rodríguez
 Javier Nart
 José Ramón Bauzà
 Jordi Cañas Pérez
 Susana Solís Pérez

On the Unidas Podemos list: (GUE–NGL)

 María Eugenia Rodríguez Palop
 Sira Rego
 Ernest Urtasun (in the Greens-EFA)
 Idoia Villanueva
 Miguel Urbán
 Manu Pineda

On the Vox list: (ECR)

 Jorge Buxadé
 Mazaly Aguilar
 Hermann Tertsch
 Margarita de la Pisa Carrión

On the Ahora Repúblicas list: (Greens-EFA)

 Oriol Junqueras
 Pernando Barrena (in the GUE–NGL) (resigned on 2 September 2022)
 Ana Miranda Paz (Galician Nationalist Bloc) (joined on 5 September 2022)
 Diana Riba

On Together for Europe list: (Non-Inscrits)

 Carles Puigdemont
 Antoni Comín

 Clara Ponsatí i Obiols

On the Coalition for a Solidary Europe list: (Renew)

 Izaskun Bilbao Barandica (PNV)

References 

Spain
List
2019